Sprinkle Spangles was a short-lived breakfast cereal by General Mills.  It was introduced in the mid 90s, alongside Hidden Treasures.  The cereal was of star-shaped pieces covered with multi-colored sprinkles.  The commercials claimed that they "Spangled every angle with sprinkles."  Sprinkle Spangles were no longer available in 1998.

Mascot
The Sprinkle Spangles mascot was the Sprinkle Genie (voiced by Dom DeLuise).  He would often appear in front of children who wished they had sprinkles for breakfast.  The Sprinkle Genie's own catchphrase was: "You wish it, I dish it!" The mascot was dropped before the cereal was retired.

See also
 List of defunct consumer brands

References 

General Mills cereals
Products introduced in 1993
Discontinued products
Historical foods in American cuisine